Henriques Zowa (born August 19, 1981) is an Angolan-Dutch professional kickboxer and boxer, fighting out of Simson Gym in Almere, Netherlands.

Career
He challenged Nathan Corbett for his WKN World Heavyweight (-96.6 kg/213 lb) Muay Thai Championship at Total Carnage IV in Gold Coast, Australia on December 14, 2013, and lost the fight by second round TKO.

Titles
Kickboxing
 K-1 Canarias 2005 Tournament Champion
Boxing
 Bigger's Better King 2011 Tournament Runner up

Kickboxing record (Incomplete)

|-  bgcolor= "#FFBBBB"
| 2017-10-29 || Loss ||align=left| Murat Aygun || WFL: Manhoef vs. Bonjasky, Final 16  || Almere, Netherlands || Decision || 3 || 3:00
|-
|-  bgcolor="#FFBBBB"
| 2013-12-14 || Loss ||align=left| Nathan Corbett || Total Carnage IV || Gold Coast, Australia || TKO (Left elbow) || 2 || 1:47
|-
! style=background:white colspan=9 |
|-
|-  bgcolor="#FFBBBB"
| 2011-07-16 || Loss ||align=left| Andrei Stoica || SUPERKOMBAT World Grand Prix II 2011 || Constanța, Romania || Decision (Unanimous) || 3 || 3:00
|-  bgcolor="#c5d2ea"
| 2011-07-04 || Draw ||align=left| Redouan Cairo || Death Before Dishonor || Almere, Netherlands || Draw || 3 || 3:00
|-  bgcolor="#CCFFCC"
| 2010-10-09 || Win ||align=left| Danyo Ilunga || Mix Fight Gala 10 || Darmstadt, Germany || TKO (Referee stoppage) || 3 || N/A
|-  bgcolor="#FFBBBB"
| 2010-09-24 || Loss ||align=left| Thiago Martina || Amsterdam fight club, Semi Finals || Amsterdam, Netherlands || Decision || 3 || 3:00
|-  bgcolor="#CCFFCC"
| 2010-05-08 || Win ||align=left| Ismael Londt || Fight Masters || Almere, Netherlands || TKO (Strikes) || N/A || N/A
|-  bgcolor="#CCFFCC"
| 2009-03-01 || Win ||align=left| Clyde van Dams || K-1 World MAX 2009 Europe Tournament || Utrecht, Netherlands || Decision (Unanimous) || 3 || 3:00
|-  bgcolor="#CCFFCC"
| 2008-08-30 || Win ||align=left| Michael Duut ||  Slamm The Return of the Iron Lady ||  || TKO (Strikes) || 2 || N7A
|-
|-  bgcolor="#FFBBBB"
| 2008-06-15 || Loss ||align=left| Mourad Bouzidi || Rumble in the Hague || The Hague, Netherlands || Decision (Unanimous) || 5 || 3:00
|-
! style=background:white colspan=9 |
|-
|-  bgcolor="#FFBBBB"
| 2008-05-31 || Loss ||align=left| Tomáš Hron || Muay Thai Fight Night || Switzerland || Decision (Unanimous)|| 3 || 3:00
|-
|-  bgcolor="#FFBBBB"
| 2008-4 || Loss ||align=left| Bahadir Sari || World Champions League ||  Turkey || Decision || 5 || 3:00
|-
|-  bgcolor="#CCFFCC"
| 2008-03-15 || Win ||align=left| Samir Benazzouz || It's Showtime 75MAX Trophy 2008 || 's-Hertogenbosch, Netherlands || Decision || 3 || 3:00
|-  bgcolor="#FFBBBB"
| 2007-10-14 || Loss ||align=left| Ashwin Balrak || The Battle of Arnhem 6 || Arnhem, Netherlands || Decision (Unanimous) || 3 || 3:00
|-  bgcolor="#FFBBBB"
| 2005-04-02 || Loss ||align=left| Humberto Evora || K-1 Canarias 2006, Quarter Final || Santa Cruz de Tenerife, Canary Islands || Decision || 3 || 3:00
|-  bgcolor="#FFBBBB"
| 2006-05-18 || Loss ||align=left| Gökhan Saki || Gala in Vlaardingen || Vlaardingen, Netherlands || Decision (Unanimous) || 5 || 3:00
|-  bgcolor="#FFBBBB"
| 2005-10-02 || Loss ||align=left| Errol Zimmerman || Gentlemen Fight Night 2 || Tilburg, Netherlands || Decision (Unanimous) || 5 || 3:00
|-  bgcolor="#CCFFCC"
| 2005-04-02 || Win ||align=left| Errol Zimmerman || K-1 Canarias 2005, Final || Tenerife, Canary Islands || Decision (Unanimous) || 3 || 3:00
|-
! style=background:white colspan=9 |
|-
|-  bgcolor="#CCFFCC"
| 2005-04-02 || Win ||align=left| Mutlu Karbulut || K-1 Canarias 2005, Semi Finals || Tenerife, Canary Islands || KO (Punch to the Body) || N/A || N/A
|-  bgcolor="#CCFFCC"
| 2005-04-02 || Win ||align=left| Hichan || K-1 Canarias 2005, Quarter Final || Tenerife, Canary Islands || KO (Knees) || N/A || N/A
|-
| colspan=9 | Legend:

See also
List of K-1 events
List of male boxers
List of male kickboxers

References

Dutch male kickboxers
Angolan male kickboxers
Heavyweight kickboxers
Dutch people of Angolan descent
Sportspeople from Luanda
1981 births
Living people
Angolan male boxers
Dutch male boxers
SUPERKOMBAT kickboxers